The plumbeous euphonia (Euphonia plumbea) is a species of bird in the family Fringillidae.
It is found in northern Brazil, Colombia, French Guiana, Guyana, Peru, Suriname, and Venezuela.
Its natural habitats are subtropical or tropical moist lowland forest and heavily degraded former forest.

References

plumbeous euphonia
Birds of the Guianas
plumbeous euphonia
Taxa named by Bernard du Bus de Gisignies
Taxonomy articles created by Polbot